Fiskalna kasa za dilera grasa is an EP by the Serbian noise-rock band Klopka Za Pionira, released in 2007 (see 2007 in music) on the Ne-ton independent label. It contains two versions of the same song dealing with police brutality of a young man who was caught with a marijuana joint. The name of the EP means "Fiscal cash register for the grass dealer" and is actively advocating legalization of marijuana.


Track listing
All lyrics by Mileta Mijatović and music by Klopka Za Pionira
"Fiskalna kasa za dilera grasa" – 4:11
"Nije gotovo dok se ne legalizuje" – 3:59

Personnel
Mileta Mijatović - vocals 
Damjan Brkić - guitar, drum machine
Vladimir Lenhart - bass guitar, tapes

References

External links 
 Free streaming of the EP on the band's official website

Klopka Za Pionira albums
2007 EPs